The Pituriaspida ('Pituri-shield' or 'hallucinogen-shield') are a small group of extinct armored jawless fishes with tremendous nose-like rostrums, which lived in the marine, deltaic environments of Middle Devonian Australia (about 390 Ma). They are known only by two species, Pituriaspis doylei and Neeyambaspis enigmatica found in a single sandstone location of the Georgina Basin, in Western Queensland, Australia.

"Pituriaspida" is often translated as 'hallucinogenic shield.'  Pituri is a hallucinogenic drug, made from the leaves of the Corkwood Tree and Acacia ash, and used by local Aborigine shamans for vision quests.  The pituriaspids' discoverer, Dr Gavin Young, named Pituriaspis after the drug because, upon examining the first specimens, he suspected he was hallucinating (Long, p 59). The better studied species - Pituriaspis doylei, which had a superficial resemblance to the Osteostraci, had an elongate headshield, that, coupled with its spear-like rostrum, gave it a throwing-dart-like appearance.  Neeyambaspis enigmatica had a much smaller and shorter rostrum, and a more triangular headshield, making it look as though it were a guitar pick with a tail.

References
Janvier, Philippe. Early Vertebrates. Oxford, New York: Oxford University Press, 1998.
Long, John A. The Rise of Fishes: 500 Million Years of Evolution. Baltimore: The Johns Hopkins University Press, 1996.

External links
Pituriaspida

 
Middle Devonian first appearances
Givetian extinctions
Prehistoric fish classes